Airbridge or air bridge may refer to:

AirBridge (alliance) or AiRUnion, a defunct Russian-backed consortium
Airbridge (band), an early-1980s British progressive-rock band
Airbridge (logistics), the route and means of delivering material from one place to another by an airlift
Airbridge (ultralight aircraft manufacturer), a Russian manufacturer of ultralights
Jet bridge or airbridge, a passenger boarding bridge used at large airports
An electronic component used to allow two traces to cross in, for instance, planar transmission line circuits

See also 
AirBridgeCargo Airlines, LLC, a subsidiary of Volga-Dnepr Airlines based in Moscow, Russia
Oriental Air Bridge Co., Ltd., a Japanese charter airline based at Nagasaki Airport
Skybridge (disambiguation), a covered bridge between two buildings